Jack Lewis Snyder (born February 6, 1951) is an American political scientist who is the Robert and Renée Belfer Professor of International Relations at Columbia University, specializing in theories of international relations.

Snyder's research centers around the relationship between violence and government. He is known for introducing the distinction between offensive and defensive realism into the international relations literature in his 1991 book Myths of Empire.

Early life and education
Snyder was born in February 1951 in Allentown, Pennsylvania. He attended Harvard University as an undergraduate, receiving a B.A. in government in 1973. From 1973 to 1975 he was on the research staff of the Wednesday Group (a grouping of liberal Republicans), and later the foreign policy staff of Illinois senator Charles H. Percy.

He pursued graduate studies at Columbia University, first receiving a certificate from the Harriman Institute (then known as the Russian Institute) in 1978 before receiving his PhD in international relations in 1981. He was a postdoctoral fellow at Harvard's Center for International Affairs before returning to teach at Columbia.

Academic work

It was in his Myths of Empire that Snyder first drew a distinction between offensive and defensive realism.

Much of Snyder's work presents challenges to the fundamental assumption of democratic peace theory: that democracies do not go to war with each other and that, therefore, democratization leads to a reduction in interstate conflict. In From Voting to Violence he argues that, rather than encourage peace, poorly managed democratization processes have often produced upsurges in nationalism and ethnic violence, as threatened political elites seek to thwart moves towards popular rule. He cites as examples Weimar Germany and the internationally sponsored 1993 presidential elections in Burundi (which led to the outbreak of a civil war later that year).

In Electing to Fight, Snyder and Mansfield argue emerging democracies with weak political institutions are more rather than less likely to go war, as their leaders often seek to rally support by invoking external threats and employing belligerent, nationalist rhetoric. Mansfield and Snyder demonstrate this pattern in a number of cases, ranging from revolutionary France to contemporary Russia under Putin.  Snyder suggests that the way to avoid nationalist conflict is to promote the growth of robust civic institutions and a solid middle class prior to democratization.

His students at Columbia included Colin Kahl, current Under Secretary of Defense for Policy.

Other activities

Snyder was Director of Columbia's Institute of War and Peace Studies from 1994 to 1997 and chair of Columbia's political science department from 1997 to 2000.

Honors

Selected bibliography

Books

Edited volumes

Selected journal articles and chapters

Other works

References

External links
Jack Snyder | Columbia SIPA

Harvard College alumni
1951 births
Living people
American political scientists
American international relations scholars
Political realists
Columbia University alumni
Columbia School of International and Public Affairs faculty
Neoclassical realists(international relations)